Andrew Barrow (born 1945) is a British journalist and author. His The Tap Dancer won the 1993 Hawthornden Prize and the McKitterick Prize for the best first novel by an author aged over 40.

References

1945 births
British journalists
Living people
Place of birth missing (living people)
Date of birth missing (living people)
British male writers